Newport Central Catholic High School (abbreviated NewCath or NCC) is a coeducational private secondary school in Newport, Kentucky and part of the Roman Catholic Diocese of Covington.  It is located in the center of Newport overlooking the Cincinnati skyline and Ohio Valley.  The school is housed in a building opened in 1955 for the all-boys Newport Catholic High School, which was founded in 1929 as the effective successor to another all-boys high school established in 1896.

Present-day Newport Central Catholic was founded in 1983 when Newport Catholic High merged with the all-girls Our Lady of Providence Academy, which had been founded as the Academy of Notre Dame de Providence in 1903. it serves students in grades 9-12 in the Northern Kentucky area, mostly from Campbell County. The mascot is the Thoroughbred, and the school colors are royal blue and gold. NCC is a member of the National Catholic Educational Association (NCEA).

Demographics
In 2009–2010 school year, the total student population was 425. 97% were white and 3% were students of color. 25% of students are on some form of financial aid.

Athletics
The old Newport Catholic High became a member of the Greater Cincinnati League in the 1940s but left after the 1970 season.

Notable alumni
This list includes alumni of Newport Central Catholic, the original Newport Catholic, and Our Lady of Providence.
John Brannen basketball player (Marshall University) and basketball head coach (Northern Kentucky University and University of Cincinnati)
Dave Cowens (Newport Catholic, 1966), Boston Celtics basketball player and NBA MVP, 1973
Drew McDonald (Newport Central Catholic, 2015), basketball player named Horizon League Player of the Year in 2019 for Northern Kentucky University
Larry Staverman (Newport Catholic, 1954), NBA basketball player with the Cincinnati Royals, Chicago Zephyrs/Baltimore Bullets, Detroit Pistons
Galadriel Stineman (Newport Central Catholic, 2002), actress and voice actor. Appeared in The Middle & Ben 10.

References

External links
 Official website

Catholic secondary schools in Kentucky
Newport, Kentucky
Educational institutions established in 1983
1983 establishments in Kentucky
Schools in Campbell County, Kentucky